Fortunato Ilario Carafa della Spina (1630–1697) was a Roman Catholic cardinal.

Biography
On 5 Oct 1687, he was consecrated bishop by Savo Millini, Bishop of Orvieto, with Francesco Pannocchieschi d'Elci, Archbishop of Pisa, serving as co-consecrator.

References

1630 births
1697 deaths
17th-century Italian cardinals
17th-century Italian Roman Catholic bishops
Clergy from Naples